Thomas "Who's Fooling Who" Hlongwane (17 March 1962 – 14 October 2006) was a South African footballer who played striker.

Arcadia Shepherds
He joined the Arcs in the late 70s and became their Footballer of the Year in 1981

Moroka Swallows
He joined Swallows for a record breaking R22 000 in 1982. Hlongwane scored 59 goals for the Birds between 1985 and 1986 scoring hat tricks against Bush Bucks, Klerksdorp City and Orlando Pirates. He won the NSL Golden Boot in 1986, catching the eye of Olympiakos.

After Retirement
By the time of his death in 2006, he was the coach at Mamelodi Sundowns development.

Death
He died in his sleep at his home in Mabopane on 14 October 2006 after a long battle with leukaemia. He was buried at Akasia Cemetery in Nina Park

References

1962 births
2006 deaths
South African soccer players
South African expatriate soccer players
Expatriate footballers in Greece
South African expatriate sportspeople in Greece
Arcadia Shepherds F.C. players
Moroka Swallows F.C. players
Olympiacos F.C. players
Durban Bush Bucks players
Association football forwards